The 2001 Samoa National League, or also known as the Upolo First Division, was the 13th edition of the Samoa National League, the top league of the Football Federation Samoa. Goldstar Sogi won their first title.

Standings
Known results from source:

Top scorers

References

Samoa National League seasons
Samoa
football